Below is a partial list of minor league baseball players of the minor league affiliates of the Arizona Diamondbacks:

Players

Blaze Alexander

Blaze Chanee Alexander (born June 11, 1999) is an American professional baseball shortstop in the Arizona Diamondbacks organization.

Alexander attended Bishop Verot High School in Fort Myers, Florida and transferred to IMG Academy in Bradenton, Florida for his senior year. He was drafted by the Arizona Diamondbacks in the 11th round of the 2018 Major League Baseball draft. Alexander spent his first professional season with the Arizona League Diamondbacks and Missoula Osprey. He played 2019 with the Kane County Cougars.

Alexander did not play in 2020 due to the Minor League Baseball season being cancelled because of the Covid-19 pandemic. He returned in 2021 to play for the Hillsboro Hops and started 2022 with the Amarillo Sod Poodles.

Alexander was optioned to the Triple-A Reno Aces to begin the 2023 season.

His brother, CJ, also plays professionally.

Jorge Barrosa

Jorge Luis Barrosa (born February 17, 2001) is a Venezuelan professional baseball outfielder in the Arizona Diamondbacks organization.

Barrosa signed with the Arizona Diamondbacks as an international free agent in July 2017. He made his professional debut in 2018, appearing in 68 games for Arizona’s rookie-level affiliates. In 2019, Barrosa spent the year with the Low-A Hillsboro Hops, slashing .251/.335/.336 with one home run, 26 RBI, and 8 stolen bases.

Barrosa did not play in a game in 2020 due to the cancellation of the minor league season because of the COVID-19 pandemic. He spent the 2021 season with High-A Hillsboro and the Single-A Visalia Rawhide, hitting a cumulative .285/.353/.422 with 7 home runs, 37 RBI, and 29 stolen bases across 96 games. In 2022, Barrosa played in 120 games split between Hillsboro and the Double-A Amarillo Sod Poodles, batting .279/.372/.439 with 26 stolen bases and career-highs in home runs (13) and RBI (57).

The Diamondbacks added him to their 40-man roster after the 2022 season. After suffering a hamstring strain in spring training, Barrosa was optioned to the Triple-A Reno Aces to begin the 2023 season.

Ryan Bliss

Ryan Isiah Bliss (born December 13, 1999) is an American professional baseball shortstop in the Arizona Diamondbacks organization. He played college baseball for the Auburn Tigers.

Bliss grew up in LaGrange, Georgia and attended Troup County High School. He hit 8 home runs and was named an All-American by Rawlings-Perfect Game as a senior. Bliss was selected in the  30th round of the 2018 Major League Baseball draft by the Boston Red Sox, but did not sign with the team.

Bliss played college baseball for the Auburn Tigers for three seasons. He became the team's starting shortstop as a freshman and was named to the Southeastern Conference (SEC) All-Freshman team after batting .281 with 50 runs scored. In 2019, he played collegiate summer baseball with the Brewster Whitecaps of the Cape Cod Baseball League. As a sophomore, he batted for a .377 average with a team-high 21 runs scored in 18 games before the season was cut short due to the coronavirus pandemic. Bliss was named a First team All-American by the NCBWA and second team All-SEC after batting .365 with 15 home runs, 14 doubles, and 45 RBIs in his junior season.

Bliss was selected in the second round with the 42nd overall pick in the 2021 Major League Baseball draft by the Arizona Diamondbacks. He signed with the team on July 18, 2021, and received a $1.25 million bonus. He made his professional debut with the Rookie-level Arizona Complex League Diamondbacks and was promoted to the Visalia Rawhide of the Low-A West after two games. Over 39 games for the 2021 season, he batted .267 with six home runs, 24 RBIs, and 13 stolen bases.

Auburn Tigers bio

Dominic Canzone

Dominic Gene Canzone (born August 16, 1997) is an American professional baseball outfielder in the Arizona Diamondbacks organization.

Canzone attended Walsh Jesuit High School in Cuyahoga Falls, Ohio. As a sophomore in 2014, he pitched  scoreless innings and batted .434 with three home runs and 27 RBIs. He earned All-Ohio honorable mention as a senior in 2016. Unselected in the 2016 Major League Baseball draft, he enrolled at Ohio State University where he played college baseball. As a freshman in 2017, Canzone started 39 games and batted .343 with three home runs, 36 RBIs, and 13 stolen bases, earning an unanimous selection to the All-Big Ten freshman team. In 2018, Canzone started sixty games and hit .323 with four home runs, 35 RBIs, 18 doubles, and 15 stolen bases. After the season, he played collegiate summer baseball with the Brewster Whitecaps of the Cape Cod Baseball League, where he was named a league all-star. As a junior in 2019, Canzone started 63 games in which he batted .345 with 16 home runs and 43 RBIs. Following the season's end, he was selected by the Arizona Diamondbacks in the eighth round with the 242nd overall pick of the 2019 Major League Baseball draft.

Canzone signed for $170,000 and made his professional debut with the Missoula Osprey of the Rookie Advanced Pioneer League. He was later promoted to the Hillsboro Hops of the Class A-Short Season Northwoods League. Over 46 games between the two clubs, he batted .281 with eight home runs, 38 RBIs, and 19 doubles. He did not play a minor league game in 2020 due to the cancellation of the season caused by the COVID-19 pandemic. He missed time throughout the 2021 season due to injury but still appeared in 79 games between Hillsboro (now members of the High-A West) and the Amarillo Sod Poodles of the Double-A Central, slashing .302/.375/.522 with 14 home runs, 52 RBIs, and 19 stolen bases. He was selected to play in the Arizona Fall League for the Salt River Rafters after the season. He returned to Amarillo to begin the 2022 season. After 11 games, he was promoted to the Reno Aces of the Triple-A Pacific Coast League. He was placed on the injured list in mid-June, and after rehabbing with the Rookie-level Arizona Complex League Diamondbacks, he was assigned back to Amarillo, and then was quickly assigned once again back to Reno. Over 106 games for the season, he slashed .299/.367/.541 with 22 home runs, 89 RBIs, 25 doubles, and 15 stolen bases.

Deyvison De Los Santos

Deyvison De Los Santos (born June 21, 2003) is an Dominican professional baseball first baseman and third baseman in the Arizona Diamondbacks organization.

De Los Santos was born and grew up in Santo Domingo, Dominican Republic. He played for the Dominican Republic national team in the 2018 U-15 Baseball World Cup.

De Los Santos was signed by the Arizona Diamondbacks for a $200,000 signing bonus. He made his professional debut with the Rookie-level Arizona Complex League Diamondbacks, where he batted .329 with five home runs in 25 games before being promoted to the Low-A Visalia Rawhide. De Los Santos returned to Visalia at the start of the 2022 season. He batted .329 in 78 games for the Rawhide before being promoted to the High-A Hillsboro Hops. De Los Santos was promoted a second time to the Amarillo Sod Poodles of the Double-A Texas League for the final two weeks of the season. He was selected to play in the Arizona Fall League for the Salt River Rafters after the season.

Josh Green

Joshua Taylor Green (born August 31, 1995) is an American professional baseball pitcher in the Arizona Diamondbacks organization.

Green attended Parkview Baptist High School in Baton Rouge, Louisiana. In 2013, his junior year, he helped lead them to a Class 3A State Championship. As a senior in 2014, he was named second team All-District. Unselected in the 2014 Major League Baseball draft, he enrolled at Southeastern Louisiana University where he played college baseball.

Green pitched only one inning as a freshman at Southeastern Louisiana in 2015. As a sophomore, he appeared in 17 games, pitching to a 2.04 ERA with 29 strikeouts over  innings. In 2017, he made 25 relief appearances, going 5–0 with a 4.14 ERA in 37 innings. That summer, he played in the Alaska Baseball League for the Mat-Su Miners, and was named an All-Star as well as to the All League team after not giving up a run over  innings and registering seven saves. As a senior in 2018, Green moved into the starting rotation, compiling a 6–6 record and a 3.14 ERA over 15 starts, striking out 59 batters over  innings. After the season, he was selected by the Arizona Diamondbacks in the 14th round of the 2018 Major League Baseball draft.

Green signed with the Diamondbacks and made his professional debut with the Hillsboro Hops of the Class A Short Season Northwest League, going 3–1 with a 1.09 ERA over 25 relief appearances, earning All-Star honors. To begin the 2019 season, he was assigned to the Visalia Rawhide of the Class A-Advanced California League before being promoted to the Jackson Generals of the Class AA Southern League in July. Over 22 starts between the two clubs, Green pitched to an 11–5 record and a 2.71 ERA over  innings. The Diamondbacks named him their Minor League Pitcher of the Year. Green did not play a minor league games in 2020 due to the cancellation of the season due the COVID-19 pandemic, and spent the summer at Arizona's alternate site, where he refined a cutter that he developed during quarantine. For the 2021 season, Green was assigned to the Reno Aces of the Triple-A West, appearing in 26 games (making 15 starts) in which he went 8-4 with a 7.34 ERA and 62 strikeouts over  innings. He returned to Reno to begin the 2022 season, but was demoted to the Amarillo Sod Poodles of the Double-A Texas League in early May. Over 38 games (two starts) between the two teams, Green went 1-3 with a 7.02 ERA, 44 strikeouts, and 29 walks over 59 innings pitched.

Levi Kelly

Levi Hunter Kelly (born May 14, 1999) is an American professional baseball pitcher in the Arizona Diamondbacks organization.

Kelly began his high school career at Nitro High School in Nitro, West Virginia. As a freshman, he committed to play college baseball at Louisiana State University. Following his freshman year, he transferred to IMG Academy in Bradenton, Florida. After his sophomore year at IMG, he transferred to Bishop Verot High School in Fort Myers, Florida. In 2017, as a junior, he went 7–1 with a 0.62 ERA and 98 strikeouts over 56 innings. Following his junior year, he transferred back to IMG Academy for his senior season. After his senior year, Kelly was drafted by the Arizona Diamondbacks in the eighth round of the 2018 Major League Baseball draft.

Kelly signed with the Diamondbacks, and made his professional debut with the Arizona League Diamondbacks of the Rookie-league, pitching six scoreless innings. In 2019, Kelly spent the season with the Kane County Cougars of the Class A Midwest League. Over 22 starts, he pitched to a 5–1 record with a 2.15 ERA, striking out 126 over  innings. Kelly did not play a minor league game in 2020 due to the cancellation of the minor league season caused by the COVID-19 pandemic. After recovering from a shoulder injury that forced him to miss the first month of the 2021 season, he was assigned to the Amarillo Sod Poodles of the Double-A Central. In mid-August, after struggling to a 5.40 ERA over 25 innings pitched in relief, he was placed on the development list, where he finished the year. He returned to Amarillo to begin the 2022 season, but pitched only one inning due to injury.

Justin Martínez

Justin Martínez (born July 30, 2001) is a Dominican professional baseball pitcher in the Arizona Diamondbacks organization.

Martínez signed with the Arizona Diamondbacks as an international free agent in March 2018. He made his professional debut with the Dominican Summer League Diamondbacks. He underwent Tommy John Surgery in 2021 and returned from the injury in the middle of the 2022 season.

After the 2022, Martínez played in the Arizona Fall League.

Martínez was optioned to the Triple-A Reno Aces to begin the 2023 season.

Brandon Pfaadt

Brandon Connor Pfaadt (born October 15, 1998) is an American professional baseball pitcher in the Arizona Diamondbacks organization.

Pfaadt attended Trinity High School in Louisville, Kentucky and played college baseball at Bellarmine University. In 2019, he played collegiate summer baseball with the Wareham Gatemen of the Cape Cod Baseball League. He was drafted by the Arizona Diamondbacks in the fifth round of the 2020 Major League Baseball draft.

Pfaadt made his professional debut in 2021 with the Visalia Rawhide and was promoted to the Hillsboro Hops and Amarillo Sod Poodles during the season. Over 22 starts between the three teams, he went 8-7 with a 3.21 ERA and 160 strikeouts over  innings.

In 2022 in the minor leagues he was 11-7 with a 3.83 ERA, and led the minors in innings pitched, with 167, as well as strikeouts, with 218.

Kristian Robinson

Kristian Devaughn Robinson (born December 11, 2000) is a Bahamian professional baseball outfielder in the Arizona Diamondbacks organization.

Robinson signed with the Arizona Diamondbacks as an international free agent in July 2017. He spent his first professional season in 2018 with the Arizona League Diamondbacks and Missoula Osprey, slashing .279/.363/.428 with seven home runs, 27 RBIs, and 12 stolen bases in 57 games. He started 2019 with the Hillsboro Hops before earning a promotion to the Kane County Cougars in August. Over 69 games between both teams, he batted .282 with 14 home runs, 51 RBIs, and 17 stolen bases.

Robinson did not play in a game in 2020 due to the cancellation of the minor league season because of the COVID-19 pandemic.

Robinson was arrested early in 2020 for allegedly punching an Arizona Department of Public Safety officer in the face after the officer found Robinson walking into traffic on Interstate 10. Robinson released a statement indicating he was suffering from mental health issues due in part to the pandemic. The start to his 2021 season was delayed because he remained in the Bahamas to deal with the resulting legal issues. On August 17, 2021, Robinson was sentenced to 18 months probation. Robinson did not play in a game for the Diamondbacks organization in 2021, but was selected to the 40-man roster following the season on November 19, 2021.

Mitchell Stumpo

Mitchell Anthony Stumpo (born June 17, 1996) is an American professional baseball pitcher in the Arizona Diamondbacks organization.

Stumpo attended Ravenscroft School in Raleigh, North Carolina and played college baseball at Guilford College in Greensboro, North Carolina, where he began pitching his sophomore year. As a senior in 2019, he went 4-3 with a 4.89 ERA over seventy innings. He went unselected in the 2019 Major League Baseball draft and signed with the Arizona Diamondbacks as an undrafted free agent.

Stumpo made his professional debut with the Rookie-level Arizona League Diamondbacks and was later promoted to the Missoula Osprey of the Rookie Advanced Pioneer League. Over 18 relief innings pitched, he went 1-1 with a 3.50 ERA and 24 strikeouts. He did not play a minor league game in 2020 due to the cancellation of the minor league season caused by the COVID-19 pandemic. He began the 2021 season with the Visalia Rawhide of the Low-A West and earned promotions to the Hillsboro Hops of the High-A West, the Amarillo Sod Poodles of the Double-A Central, and the Reno Aces of the Triple-A West during the season. Over  innings pitched in relief between the four teams, Stumpo went 1-1 with a 2.63 ERA and 66 strikeouts. He was selected to play in the Arizona Fall League for the Salt River Rafters after the season. He returned to Reno for the 2022 season. Over 45 relief appearances, he went 1-2 with a 3.53 ERA, 51 strikeouts, and 31 walks over  innings.

Matt Tabor

Matt Tabor (born July 14, 1998) is an American professional baseball pitcher in the Arizona Diamondbacks organization.

Tabor attended Milton Academy in Milton, Massachusetts. As a junior in 2016, he had a 1.07 ERA. In 2017, his senior year, he struck out 75 batters over 42 innings and compiled a 0.67 ERA. Following the season, he was selected by the Arizona Diamondbacks in the third round of the 2017 Major League Baseball draft. He signed with Arizona for $1 million, forgoing his college commitment to play college baseball at Elon University.

After signing, Tabor made his professional debut with the Arizona League Diamondbacks, pitching  innings. In 2018, he pitched for the Hillsboro Hops of the Class A Short Season Northwest League, going 2–1 with a 3.26 ERA over 14 starts. Following the season's end, he was named a Northwest League All-Star. Tabor spent the 2019 season with the Kane County Cougars of the Class A Midwest League in which he went 5–4 with a 2.93 ERA over 21 starts, striking out 101 batters over  innings. Tabor did not play a minor league game in 2020 due to the cancellation of the minor league season caused by the COVID-19 pandemic.

To begin the 2021 season, Tabor returned to Hillsboro, now members of the High-A West. In late May, after pitching to a 2–2 record with a 3.00 ERA over 24 innings, he was promoted to the Amarillo Sod Poodles of the Double-A Central. On July 11, he threw the first no-hitter in Sod Poodles history, striking out three and walking two in a seven inning game as Amarillo defeated the San Antonio Missions by a score of 6–1. After ten starts in which he compiled a 3–5 record with a 3.88 ERA and 47 strikeouts over 51 innings with Amarillo, he was promoted to the Reno Aces of the Triple-A West in late July. Over eight starts with Reno, Tabor went 1-4 with an 11.13 ERA over  innings. He returned to Amarillo to begin the 2022 season, but pitched in only one game before a Thoracic Outlet/Posterior Circumflex Humeral Artery Aneurysm injury forced him to miss the remainder of the season.

Carlos Vargas

Carlos Miguel Vargas (born October 13, 1999) is a Dominican professional baseball pitcher for the Arizona Diamondbacks of Major League Baseball (MLB).

Vargas was signed by the Cleveland Indians as an international free agent on July 2, 2016. The Indians selected Vargas' contract on November 20, 2020, adding him to their 40-man roster.

In April 2021, Vargas underwent ulnar collateral ligament reconstruction (Tommy John surgery), causing him to miss the entire 2021 season. He began the 2022 season on the rebranded Cleveland Guardians' major league 60-day injured list as he continued to recover from surgery. Vargas was activated from the injured list on July 18, 2022 and optioned to the Double-A Akron RubberDucks. He was promoted to the Guardians' Triple-A affiliate, the Columbus Clippers, on September 3, 2022.

The Guardians recalled Vargas to their active roster on September 16, 2022. He was optioned back to Columbus on September 20 without having made an appearance for the Guardians.

Vargas was traded to the Arizona Diamondbacks on November 15, 2022 in exchange for minor league pitcher Ross Carver.

A. J. Vukovich

 Aaron Jeffrey Vukovich (born July 20, 2001) is an American professional baseball third baseman in the Arizona Diamondbacks organization.

Vukovich attended East Troy High School in East Troy, Wisconsin. He was drafted by the Arizona Diamondbacks in the fourth round of the 2020 Major League Baseball draft. He played his first season in 2021 with the Visalia Rawhide and Hillsboro Hops. In his 92 games that season, he had a .272/.320/.446 slash line, with 100 hits, 19 doubles, 3 triples, 13 home runs, 62 RBI, and 16 stolen bases

Vukovich started 2022 with Hillsboro before being promoted to the Amarillo Sod Poodles.

Blake Walston

Matthew Blake Walston (born June 28, 2001) is an American professional baseball pitcher in the Arizona Diamondbacks organization.

Walston attended New Hanover High School in Wilmington, North Carolina. In 2019, his senior year, he went 12–0 with a 0.20 ERA, striking out 129 batters in  innings pitched. He was named North Carolina's Gatorade Baseball Player of the Year. Walston was also named the 2019 North Carolina High School Player of the Year by Perfect Game. He committed to play college baseball at North Carolina State University.

Walston was selected by the Arizona Diamondbacks with the 26th overall pick in the 2019 Major League Baseball draft. He signed for $2.45 million.

Walston made his professional debut with the Rookie-level Arizona League Diamondbacks before earning a promotion to the Hillsboro Hops of the Class A Short Season Northwest League. Over 11 innings between both teams, he compiled a 2.45 ERA and 17 strikeouts. He did not play a minor league game in 2020 due to the cancellation of the minor league season caused by the COVID-19 pandemic. To begin the 2021 season, he was assigned to the Visalia Rawhide of the Low-A West. He was promoted to Hillsboro (now members of the High-A West) in July. Over 19 starts between the two teams, Walston went 4-5 with a 3.76 ERA and 117 strikeouts over  innings.

Full Triple-A to Rookie League rosters

Triple-A

Double-A

High-A

Single-A

Rookie

Foreign Rookie

References

Arizona Diamondbacks minor league affiliates
Arizona
Minor league players